The Minister of Algerian Affairs (French: Ministre d’État aux Affaires Algériennes) or Minister of Algeria (French: Ministre de l'Algérie) was a ministerial post in the Government of France from its creation in 1858 until Algerian independence in 1962. The Ministry was created to supervise administration of French Algeria through a military governor general assisted by a civil minister. Previously, the governor general alone wielded civil and military jurisdiction. Notably, the Ministry was empowered to implement the Constantine Plan to economically and socially develop Algeria in preparation for their independence.

Office Holders

References

French Algeria
Government ministries of France
Ministries established in 1858
1858 establishments in France
1962 disestablishments in France